William Franklin Walker  (July 1, 1896 – January 27, 1992) was an American television and film actor. Walker is best remembered for his role as Reverend Sykes in the 1962 film To Kill a Mockingbird.

Career
Born in Pendleton, Indiana, Walker began his acting career in 1946. In a career that spanned five decades, Walker appeared in numerous television shows and films including Goodyear Television Playhouse, Raintree County, Yancy Derringer, Official Detective, The Amos 'n' Andy Show, The Twilight Zone, Rawhide, Daniel Boone, Good Times, The Long, Hot Summer, To Kill a Mockingbird, Big Jake,  What's Happening!!, Twilight's Last Gleaming, The President's Plane is Missing, Our Man Flint, Billy Jack Goes to Washington, Maurie, A Piece of the Action, The Girl Who Had Everything, and The Choirboys.

He was in the 1961 film The Mask, not to be confused with the Twilight Zone episode "The Masks" (1964), in which he also appeared (uncredited).

Personal life
On February 22, 1953, Walker married Hannah Robison Linden, a writer and civic worker in Los Angeles. On August 13, 1959, Walker married Canadian actress Peggy Cartwright, a member of the original silent Our Gang troupe.

Death
Walker died of cancer on January 27, 1992. A World War I United States Army veteran, he is buried alongside his wife at Riverside National Cemetery in Riverside, California.

Filmography

References
 

Bill Walker marries Hannah Robinson (sic) Linden with photo

External links

 
 

1896 births
1992 deaths
African-American male actors
American male film actors
American male television actors
Burials at Riverside National Cemetery
Deaths from cancer in California
Male actors from Indiana
20th-century American male actors
People from Pendleton, Indiana
20th-century African-American people